Season 2008–09 saw Greenock Morton compete in their second consecutive season in the First Division. They finished sixth in the league, a rise from the previous season's avoidance of the relegation play-off by one goal.

First team transfers
From end of 2007–08 season, to last match of season 2008–09

In

Out

Squad (that played for first team)

Fixtures and results

Friendlies

Irn-Bru Scottish Football League First Division

Homecoming Scottish Cup

League Cup

Challenge Cup

Player statistics

Overall

League table

See also 

Greenock Morton F.C. seasons
Greenock Morton